The 1904 All-Western college football team consists of American football players selected to the All-Western teams chosen by various selectors for the 1904 Western Conference football season.

All-Western selections

Ends
 Claude Rothgeb, Illinois (COL-1, CRH, CT-1, DFP, DT, MJ-2, SLR, WC)
 James Irving Bush, Wisconsin (COL-1, CRH, CT-2, DFP, DT, MJ-1, WC)
 Frederick A. Speik, Chicago (COL-2, CT-2, MJ-2, SLR)
 Bobby Marshall, Minnesota (COL-2, MJ-1) (CFHOF)
 Charles Ferguson Kennedy, Chicago (CT-1)

Tackles
 Joe Curtis, Michigan (COL-1, CRH, CT-1, DFP, DT, MJ-1, SLR, WC)
 Wilson Bertke, Wisconsin (COL-1, DFP, MJ-1, SLR, WC)
 Ed Parry, Chicago (COL-2, CT-1, DT)
 Percy Porter Brush, Minnesota (CRH, CT-2, MJ-2)
 Charles J. Moynihan, Illinois (CT-2)
 Henry H. Kafir, Northwestern (COL-2)
 George Leland Case, Minnesota (MJ-2)

Guards
 Walton W. Thorpe, Minnesota (COL-1, CRH, CT-1, DFP, DT, MJ-1, SLR, WC)
 Charles A. Fairweather, Illinois (COL-1, CRH, CT-1, DFP, SLR, WC)
 Charles B. Carter, Michigan (COL-2, CT-2, DT, MJ-1)
 Daniel D. Smith, Minnesota (CT-2)
 Henry Schulte, Michigan (COL-2)
 Louis Donovan, Wisconsin (MJ-2)
 William Atkinson, Iowa (MJ-2)

Centers
 John Hazelwood, Illinois (COL-1, CRH, CT-1, SLR)
 Richard W. Remp, Wisconsin (COL-2, CT-2, DFP, DT, WC)
 Moses Lane Strathern, Minnesota (MJ-1)
 Charles T. Borg, Nebraska (MJ-2)

Quarterbacks
 Walter Eckersall, Chicago (COL-1, CRH, CT-1, DFP, DT, MJ-2, SLR, WC) (CFHOF)
 Sigmund Harris, Minnesota (COL-2, CT-2, MJ-1)

Halfbacks
 Willie Heston, Michigan (COL-1, CRH, CT-1, DFP, DT, MJ-1, SLR, WC) (CFHOF)
 E. J. Vanderboom, Wisconsin (COL-2, CT-2, DFP, DT, MJ-2, SLR, WC)
 Thomas S. Hammond, Michigan (CRH, CT-1, DFP [tackle])
 Otto Nelson Davies, Minnesota (COL-1, CT-2, MJ-1)
 Mark Catlin Sr., Chicago (CT-2, SLR)
 John R. Bender, Nebraska (CT-2, MJ-2)
 James Edward Kremer, Minnesota (COL-2)

Fullbacks
 Frank Longman, Michigan (COL-1, CRH, CT-2, DFP, DT, MJ-2)
 Hugo Bezdek, Chicago (COL-2, CT-1, WC) (CFHOF)
 Earl Current, Minnesota (CT-2, MJ-1)

Key
COL = Collier's Weekly

CRH = Chicago Record-Herald

CT = Chicago Tribune

DFP = Detroit Free Press

DT = Detroit Tribune

MJ = The Minneapolis Journal, by O'Loughlin

SLR = The St. Louis Republic

WC = Walter Camp in Collier's Weekly

CFHOF = College Football Hall of Fame

See also
1904 College Football All-America Team

References

All-Western team
All-Western college football teams